Polyommatus avinovi is a butterfly in the family Lycaenidae. It was described by Yuri Shchetkin in 1980. It is found in Central Asia.

Subspecies
Polyommatus avinovi avinovi (Peter I Mountains)
Polyommatus avinovi dangara (Eckweiler, 1997) (southern slope of the Eastern Gissar Mountains)

References

Butterflies described in 1980
Polyommatus
Butterflies of Asia